Ratko Ninković (born 16 April 1967) is a Bosnian professional football manager and former player.

Playing career
Ninković started his professional career at Željezničar in which he has spent six years, from 1985 until 1991. After that, he played football for Adelaide City in Australia, Penang in Malaysia and Sparta Rotterdam and Spijkenisse in the Netherlands, where he ended his career in 1999.

Managerial career
After finishing his career, Ninković returned to Bosnia and Herzegovina and was manager of Famos Hrasnica for two seasons, and then a coach in the Željezničar youth team. In 2005, he was named manager of the Željezničar first team, but did not stay there for long as he stepped down in March 2006. After Željezničar, Ninković became the new manager of Croatian club Segesta on 5 July 2010. He left Segesta in January 2011.

Ninković was then appointed as HAŠK manager in February 2012, staying there until October 2017. After HAŠK, he was manager for two months at Tuzla City (back then still known as Sloga Simin Han) in 2018. On 7 July 2019, he was next appointed at 3. HNL club Maksimir.

Honours

Manager
Zvijezda Gradačac
First League of FBiH: 2007–08

References

External links
 

1967 births
Living people
People from Višegrad
Serbs of Bosnia and Herzegovina
Association footballers not categorized by position
Yugoslav footballers
Bosnia and Herzegovina footballers
FK Željezničar Sarajevo players
Adelaide City FC players
Penang F.C. players
Sparta Rotterdam players
VV Spijkenisse players
Yugoslav First League players
Bosnia and Herzegovina expatriate footballers
Expatriate soccer players in Australia
Expatriate footballers in Malaysia
Bosnia and Herzegovina expatriate sportspeople in Malaysia
Expatriate footballers in the Netherlands
Bosnia and Herzegovina expatriate sportspeople in the Netherlands
Bosnia and Herzegovina football managers
FK Famos Hrasnica managers
FK Željezničar Sarajevo managers
NK Brotnjo managers
NK Zvijezda Gradačac managers
HNK Segesta managers
HAŠK managers
FK Tuzla City managers
Premier League of Bosnia and Herzegovina managers
Bosnia and Herzegovina expatriate football managers
Expatriate football managers in Croatia
Bosnia and Herzegovina expatriate sportspeople in Croatia